Idriss Azami Al Idrissi ( - born 16 September 1966, Fes) is a Moroccan politician with the Justice and Development Party. Since 3 January 2012, he holds the position of Minister-Delegate for the Budget in the cabinet of Abdelilah Benkirane.

See also
Cabinet of Morocco

References

Living people
Government ministers of Morocco
1966 births
People from Fez, Morocco
Sidi Mohamed Ben Abdellah University alumni
University of Poitiers alumni
Mohammed V University alumni
University of Paris alumni
Moroccan expatriates in France
Justice and Development Party (Morocco) politicians